Rumbek East County is an administrative area (county) located in Lakes State, South Sudan. In August 2016, the former Rumbek East County had split to create Eastern Bhar Naam County and Western Bhar Naam County.
Headquarter of Rumbek East is located at Thon-Aduel

References

Counties of South Sudan